Shabir Ally is a Canadian Islamic preacher and religious scholar. As of 2020 he was the President of the Islamic Information & Dawah Centre International in Toronto. He is best known for his contextual interpretation of the Qur'anic verses, and justification in similar expressions within the Christian Bible. A study concluded that Ally has contributed to the da’wah field by adopting preaching methods targeted at both the Muslim population and the non-Muslim population.

Biography
Shabir Ally was born in Guyana, and moved to Canada with his family in 1978. He received his B.A. in Religious Studies from Laurentian University and his M.A. and Ph.D. from the University of Toronto. His PhD thesis was on the exegesis of the Qur'an (Tafsir).

Publications
Ally is an author, and has published the following:
Reply to Robert Morey's source of Islam theories, Riyadh, Saudi Arabia : Dar Al-Hadyan, 1997.
Is Jesus God? The Bible Says No!, Riyadh, Saudi Arabia : Dar Al-Hadyan, 1998.
101 questions to ask visiting Jehovah's Witnesses, Toronto, Canada : Islamic Information & Daʼwah Centre International, 1997. A second volume is entitled Another five questions to keep you going.
Yahweh, Jehovah or Allah : which is God's real name?, Toronto, Canada : Al-Attique, 1999.
101 clear contradictions in the Bible, Toronto, Canada : Al-Attique, 2001.
What God said about eating pork : & issue for Muslims / Christian dialogue, Toronto, Canada : Al-Attique, 2003.
Science in the Qur'an, Toronto, Canada : Al-Attique, 2003.
Common questions people ask about Islam, Toronto, Canada : Islamic Information & Da`wah Centre International, 2008.
Christianity Vs. Islam : A Muslim and a Christian Debate 8 Crucial Questions, Minnesota, United States : Bethany House Publishers, 2014. Co-authored with James R. White.

References

External links

Official website

Year of birth missing (living people)
Living people
Canadian Muslims
Canadian Sunni Muslims
Guyanese emigrants to Canada
Laurentian University alumni
University of Toronto alumni
Muslim apologists
Canadian people of Gujarati descent
Critics of Christianity
21st-century Muslim scholars of Islam
20th-century Muslims
21st-century Muslims
Canadian people of Indo-Guyanese descent